Ilya Mikhailovich Mironov (born 17 April 2001) is a Russian pair skater. He and his former skating partner, Diana Mukhametzianova, were the 2020 Winter Youth Olympic silver medalists and the 2019–20 Junior Grand Prix Final silver medalists.

Personal life 
Mironov was born on 17 April 2001 in Moscow, Russia.

Career

Early years 
Mironov began learning how to skate in 2005. He competed internationally as a single skater on the junior level from the 2014–15 figure skating season through the 2017–18 season, after which he switched to pairs and teamed up with his current partner, Diana Mukhametzianova. For their first two seasons together, Mukhametzianova/Mironov only competed domestically, and finished 6th at the 2019 Russian Junior Figure Skating Championships.

2019–20 season: Winter Youth Olympic and JGP Final silver medalists 
Mukhametzianova/Mironov made their junior international debut at the 2019 JGP Russia. They placed third at the event behind fellow Russian competitors Kseniia Akhanteva / Valerii Kolesov and Iuliia Artemeva / Mikhail Nazarychev. At their second assignment, the 2019 JGP Croatia, the team placed second, again behind teammates Artemeva/Nazarychev, and with 24 qualifying points advanced a spot to the 2019–20 Junior Grand Prix Final. The pair competed once more before the Final, earning a silver medal in the junior event at the 2019 Volvo Open Cup behind Apollinariia Panfilova / Dmitry Rylov.

At the 2019–20 Junior Grand Prix Final, Mukhametzianova/Mironov delivered two clean programs to win the silver medal behind Panfilova/Rylov. The team won the free skate, but were unable to fully make up the margin set by the gold medalists in the short program. They set personal bests in all segments of competition at the event.

Despite qualifying, Mukhametzianova/Mironov elected to sit out of the 2020 Russian Figure Skating Championships due to fatigue from the Junior Grand Prix Final. They next competed at the 2020 Winter Youth Olympics, where they again finished second behind Panfilova/Rylov. At the 2020 Russian Junior Figure Skating Championships, Mukhametzianova/Mironov finished just off the podium in fourth and as such narrowly missed being named to the 2020 World Junior Figure Skating Championships.

Programs

With Mukhametzianova

Competitive highlights 
JGP: Junior Grand Prix

With Geinish

With Mukhametzianova

As a single skater

Detailed results 
Small medals for short and free programs awarded only at ISU Championships.

With Geinish

With Mukhametzianova

References 

2001 births
Living people
Russian male pair skaters
Figure skaters from Moscow
Figure skaters at the 2020 Winter Youth Olympics
Russian male figure skaters